Trumbauer is a surname. Notable people with the surname include: 

Frankie Trumbauer (1901–1956), American jazz saxophonist
Horace Trumbauer (1868–1938), American architect
Lisa Trutkoff Trumbauer (born 1963), American author